Slovenia participated at the 2010 Winter Olympics in Vancouver, British Columbia, Canada. Alpine skier Tina Maze won two silver medals, and cross-country skier Petra Majdič won bronze in the women's sprint event, despite having crashed into a pit during warm-up, suffering four broken ribs and a punctured lung.

Among other notable results were Robert Kranjec's 6th place in normal hill and 9th place in large hill ski jumping event, Tina Maze's 9th place in slalom, and Aleš Gorza's 10th place in giant slalom.

Medalists

Alpine skiing 

Men

Women

Biathlon 

Men

Men's relay

Women

Women's relay

Cross-country skiing 

Vesna Fabjan
Barbara Jezeršek
Katja Višnar

Figure skating

Freestyle skiing

Luge

Nordic combined

Skeleton

Ski jumping

Snowboarding 

Halfpipe

Parallel GS

Snowboard cross

References

2010 in Slovenian sport
Nations at the 2010 Winter Olympics
2010